Voříšek (feminine Voříšková) is a Czech surname. Notable persons with the surname include:
 Jan Václav (Hugo) Voříšek (1791–1825), Czech composer
 Dick Vorisek (1918–1989), American sound engineer
 Petr Voříšek (born 1979), Czech footballer
 Ondřej Voříšek (1986–2004), Czech footballer
 Tereza Voříšková (born 1989), Czech film and television actress

See also
 

Czech-language surnames